Janez Lantheri was a Slovenian politician of the early 16th century. He became mayor of Ljubljana in 1504.
He was succeeded by Gregor Lagner in 1505.

References 

Mayors of Ljubljana
Year of birth missing
16th-century Slovenian people
16th-century deaths